The Pond is an informal term for the Atlantic Ocean.

The Pond may also refer to:
The Pond (album), 2012 Kathryn Williams album
 The Pond (intelligence organization), a secret, unacknowledged espionage organization that operated on behalf of the U.S. government from 1942 to 1955
 nickname of the Honda Center, an indoor arena in Anaheim, California
 A common name for Sand Pits Lake in Ottawa, Ontario.

See also
 Pond
 Pond (disambiguation)
 Big pond (disambiguation)
 The Ponds (disambiguation)
 The Pond—Moonlight, 1904 photograph by Edward Steichen